George Charles Grey (2 December 1918 – 30 July 1944) was Liberal Member of Parliament (MP) for the Berwick-upon-Tweed constituency in England from August
1941 until his death in action in July 1944.

Early life 
George Charles Grey was the son of Major-General Wulff Henry Grey CB, CMG of the Royal Engineers and Alix Grey. His education took in Durnford School at Langton Matravers, Winchester College and, following a year at Berlin University, to Hertford College, Oxford.

Politics 
From the 1931 election, when Grey braved public opinion at his private school by flaunting the Liberal colours, he was a devoted and unswervingly faithful adherent of the Liberal Party.
He stood unopposed in a by-election triggered by Sir Hugh Michael Seely being elevated to the peerage. He was sworn in at the House of Commons on 9 September 1941.
Grey made his maiden speech there on 17 December 1941 in a debate on 'service pay and dependants' allowances'. He closed his speech with these words -

Between his election and his death, he was the youngest member of the House of Commons, having been elected at the age of 22. Not only was he youngest member of that Parliament, he was the youngest MP of the 20th Century.

Following the death of Grey when he was killed in action with his regiment in France, William Beveridge retained Berwick for the Liberals in the subsequent by-election.

His death was noted by the House when Speaker of the Commons, Douglas Clifton Brown informed the Members. His words were recorded in Hansard:

Military career 
In 1938, Grey joined the Grenadier Guards Supplementary Reserve of Officers. He served with the regiment during the Battle of France and participated in the Dunkirk Evacuation.

A captain in the 4th Battalion Grenadier Guards, he was participating in Operation Bluecoat when he was killed by a sniper as his tank was hit advancing through Lutain Wood.

He was buried on the battlefield by his men, on the site of which his family later erected a memorial. The residents of Le Repas and Captain Grey's family were 'emphatic in their desire' for the grave to remain in place. The stone for the cross came from the Houses of Parliament in London. The site is now recognised as a war grave, designated the Livry (Le Repas) Isolated Grave.

A memorial service was held at St. Margaret's, Westminster on 27 September 1944.

References

External links 

1918 births
1944 deaths
Liberal Party (UK) MPs for English constituencies
UK MPs 1935–1945
Grenadier Guards officers
British Army personnel killed in World War II
Deaths by firearm in France